Sala is a town in central Burkina Faso. It is in Satiri Department, Houet Province, Hauts-Bassins Region.

Transport 

It is served by a station on the Abidjan-Niger Railway.

See also 

 Railway stations in Burkina Faso

References 

Populated places in the Hauts-Bassins Region